Clarence Earl Cartwright was a minor league baseball player an American football player and coach. He graduated from Indiana University in 1912, where he played fullback on the football team and was later an assistant coach.

He served as the head football coach at Baldwin–Wallace College–now Baldwin Wallace University–in Berea, Ohio from 1920 to 1921 and at Illinois Wesleyan University from 1923 to 1926, where he also served as the school's head baseball coach in 1927.

References

External links
 

Year of birth missing
Year of death missing
American football fullbacks
Baldwin Wallace Yellow Jackets football coaches
Evansville Yankees players
Indiana Hoosiers football coaches
Indiana Hoosiers football players
Illinois Wesleyan Titans baseball coaches
Illinois Wesleyan Titans football coaches